The 2018–19 3. Liga was the eleventh season of the 3. Liga. It began on 27 July 2018 and concluded on 18 May 2019. For the first time in the history of the 3. Liga, no reserve teams managed to obtain a spot in the league. VfL Osnabrück and Karlsruher SC gained promotion the 2. Bundesliga, with Wehen Wiesbaden also earning promotion through the play-offs, while Energie Cottbus, Sportfreunde Lotte, Fortuna Köln and VfR Aalen were relegated to the Regionalliga.

Teams

Team changes

Stadiums and locations

Personnel and kits

Managerial changes

League table

Results

Top scorers

Number of teams by state

References

2018–19 in German football leagues
2018-19
Germany